Behold: A Christmas Collection is the second studio album and first Christmas album by American contemporary Christian music singer and songwriter Lauren Daigle. It was released on October 21, 2016, through Centricity Music. A deluxe edition was released on November 2, 2018 and included three extra songs.

Background
In an interview with Billboards Jim Asker, Daigle said "I know. I was sitting there in Louisiana and Paul and Paul were in Nashville. As the writing process progressed, I was thinking about the 400 years between the Old and New Testaments in the Bible, when God was silent for 400 years. There was stillness in the world, people were searching. I wonder how that longing was for people living then. To be honest, it kind of reminds me of today and the longing in people. As I think about those many years of silence, I think of the cry of a baby. We put these stories in a parallel position in the lyrics, connecting to our music and hoping for an ultimate connection with people, through God."

Singles
"Jingle Bells", "Have Yourself a Merry Little Christmas" and "What Child Is This" were all released to Christian radio on November 25, 2016. "O Holy Night" was the fourth single from the album, released to Christian radio on November 24, 2017. On October 19, 2018, "Winter Wonderland" was released as the fifth single to Christian radio.

Commercial performance
Behold: A Christmas Collection debuted at No. 77 on the US Billboard 200 on November 12, 2016. It went on to peak at No. 29 on December 17, 2016. The album debuted at No. 18 on the US Billboard Christian Albums chart on November 5, 2016. It went on to peak at No. 1 on December 31, 2016.

Track listing

Charts

Weekly charts

Year-end charts

Release history

References

2016 Christmas albums
Christmas albums by American artists
Centricity Music albums
Lauren Daigle albums